The 2016 MAAC women's soccer tournament is the postseason women's soccer tournament for the Metro Atlantic Athletic Conference to be held from October 29 to November 6, 2016. The five match tournament will be held at campus sites, with the semifinals and final held at Hesse Field in West Long Branch, New Jersey. The six team single-elimination tournament will consist of three rounds based on seeding from regular season conference play. The Siena Saints are the defending tournament champions after defeating the Manhattan Jaspers in the championship match.

Bracket

Schedule

First Round

Semifinals

Final

References 

 
Metro Atlantic Athletic Conference Women's Soccer Tournament